Jameh Mosque of Sojas belongs to the Seljuq dynasty and is located in the Khodabandeh County, Sojas.

Sources 

Mosques in Iran
Mosque buildings with domes
National works of Iran
Sojas